Jennifer Jaime Rocha is an American, former collegiate right-handed softball pitcher and coach. She is the current associate head coach at Oklahoma where she was a starting pitcher from 1996 to 1998.

Coaching career

Florida (asst.)
Rocha began coaching at Florida as an assistant coach in 2006. Prior to the 2018 season, Rocha was promoted to the level of associate head coach of the Florida softball program.

Oklahoma (asst.)
On July 18, 2018, Jennifer Rocha was announced as the new associate head coach and pitching coach of the Oklahoma softball program, replacing Melyssa Lombardi who left to be the head coach of Oregon.

Personal life
Rocha was married in 2006 to her husband Paul Rocha. They have one daughter named Eliana.

Statistics

References

Living people
Softball players from California
Oklahoma Sooners softball players
Oklahoma Sooners softball coaches
Oregon Ducks softball coaches
Year of birth missing (living people)
Florida Gators softball coaches
Wichita State Shockers softball coaches